The Sainsbury Institute for Art (SIfA) is based in the Sainsbury Centre for Visual Arts at the University of East Anglia in the United Kingdom.

Organization 
The Sainsbury Institute for Art is an umbrella organization that brings together the activities and expertise of the Sainsbury Centre for Visual Arts, the School of World Art Studies and Museology (WAM), the Sainsbury Institute for the Study of Japanese Arts and Cultures (SISJAC) and the Sainsbury Research Unit for the Arts of Africa, Oceania and the Americas (SRU). "The Institute works to develop an integrated approach to art as a global phenomenon through a combination of disciplinary approaches, exhibitions and programming".SIfA was officially opened on 16 November 2011. Neil MacGregor, Director of the British Museum, gave the inaugural lecture. The institute's study area was designed by Foster and Partners.

Centre for Archaeology and Heritage 
The Sainsbury Institute has among other divisions the Centre for Archaeology and Heritage which was established in 2011. The Centre focuses on research projects in the field of archaeology in Japan as well as the cultural heritage, working as a hub of researchers and students interested in the prehistoric to historic background of Japanese culture.

The Lisa Sainsbury Library 
In 2003, the facilities of the Lisa Sainsbury Library was inaugurated by Orita Masaki, the Ambassador of Japan on the Norwich headquarters of the Sainsbury Institute. Researchers of Japanese studies can make appointment to use the library for reference books and digitized materials.

Management Board 
Ex-officio Members

David Richardson, Vice-Chancellor, University of East Anglia (Chair)

Valerie Amos, Baroness Amos

Peter Hesketh

Elizabeth Esteve-Coll

Masatomo Kawai

Non-ex-officio Members

Tim Lankester KCB

Stephen McEnally

David Warren (diplomat)

Ex-officio Participating Observer

Sarah Barrow

Philip Gilmartin

Simon Kaner

Nicole Rousmaniere

Japan based non-ex-officio Participating Observer

Tadashi Kobayashi

Publications 

 
 
 
 
 
 
 
 
 
 
 
 
 
 : an exhibition catalogue at Embassy of Japan in London, between 24 June and 18 July 2013

References

External links 

The School of World Art Studies & Museology, UEA
Sainsbury Centre for Visual Arts, UEA
Sainsbury Research Unit for the Arts of Africa, Oceania & the Americas, UEA
Sainsbury Institute for the Study of Japanese Arts and Cultures
Neil MacGregor's SIfA Inaugural Lecture



University of East Anglia
Japanese art collectors
Educational organisations based in the United Kingdom
Archaeological research institutes